The second season of the American political drama television series The West Wing aired in the United States on NBC from October 4, 2000 to May 16, 2001 and consisted of 22 episodes.

Production 
The second season made frequent use of flashbacks, revealing Bartlet's campaign for the presidency in the period prior to events covered in the first season. The first two episodes, "In the Shadow of Two Gunmen, Part I" and "In the Shadow of Two Gunmen, Part II", showed how many of the central characters were introduced to Josiah Bartlet, his campaign for the presidential nomination, and his election. Aaron Sorkin originally planned to have such flashbacks as a major part of the entire season, but budget and logistical demands prevented this.

Cast 
The second season had star billing for eight major roles. Seven of these were filled by returning main cast members from the first season, while Moira Kelly departed the cast at the end of the previous season. Rob Lowe once again receives star billing, while Martin Sheen receives the "and" credit for his role as President Josiah Bartlet. The rest of the ensemble, now including previously recurring Janel Moloney, are credited alphabetically.

Main cast 
 Rob Lowe as Sam Seaborn, Deputy Communications Director
 Dulé Hill as Charlie Young, Personal Aide to the President
 Allison Janney as C. J. Cregg, White House Press Secretary
 Janel Moloney as Donna Moss, Assistant to the Deputy Chief of Staff
 Richard Schiff as Toby Ziegler, Communications Director
 John Spencer as Leo McGarry, White House Chief of Staff
 Bradley Whitford as Josh Lyman, Deputy Chief of Staff
 Martin Sheen as Josiah Bartlet, President of the United States

Recurring cast 
 Stockard Channing as Abbey Bartlet, First Lady of the United States
 Kathryn Joosten as Dolores Landingham, Executive  Secretary to the President
 Elisabeth Moss as Zoey Bartlet, The President's youngest daughter
 Tim Matheson as John Hoynes, Vice President of the United States
 John Amos as Percy Fitzwallace, Chairman of the Joint Chiefs of Staff
 Nicole Robinson as Margaret Hooper, Assistant to the White House Chief of Staff

Plot 
The second season details the period between the end of President Bartlet's second year in office and the middle of his third. It covers a wider legislative array than the first season does, and presents issues including the rights of hate groups and the Comprehensive Nuclear-Test-Ban Treaty.

In this season, The West Wing characters are shown as being more capable of legislating thanks to an increased approval rating (described as a temporary "bubble" due to the shooting that ends the first season). Also vital to this theme is the new doctrine for legislating laid out in the first-season episode "Let Bartlet Be Bartlet."

The multiple sclerosis arc (also introduced in the first season) becomes central late in the second season as staff members are introduced one-by-one to the President's ailment and the public made aware. This theme remains central to the entire series.

Mrs. Landingham, the longtime secretary of President Bartlet, dies in the penultimate episode, "18th and Potomac." In the final episode, "Two Cathedrals," Mrs. Landingham's funeral is central as is the question of whether the President will run for re-election.

The season ends with the President announcing his multiple sclerosis, and concludes just moments before he answers a reporter's question: "Mr. President, can you tell us right now if you'll be seeking a second term?"

Episodes

Reception

Critical response
On Rotten Tomatoes, the season has an approval rating of 81% with an average score of 10 out of 10 based on 16 reviews. The website's critical consensus reads, "President Bartlet is tested by his biggest scandal yet, but The West Wings approval ratings are way up in a second season that is teeming with dramas on a national scale and burning with an idealistic fervor that will have viewers cheering."

Accolades
The second season received 18 Emmy Award nominations for the 53rd Primetime Emmy Awards, winning a total of 8 awards. Consecutive wins included Outstanding Drama Series, Outstanding Supporting Actress in a Drama Series (Allison Janney), Outstanding Directing for a Drama Series (Thomas Schlamme for "In the Shadow of Two Gunmen"), and Outstanding Cinematography for a Single Camera Series (Thomas Del Ruth). Bradley Whitford won for Outstanding Supporting Actor in a Drama Series, and the series also won for Outstanding Casting for a Drama Series, Outstanding Single Camera Picture Editing for a Series, and  Outstanding Single Camera Sound Mixing for a Series. Notable nominations included Martin Sheen and Rob Lowe for Outstanding Lead Actor in a Drama Series, John Spencer and Richard Schiff for Outstanding Supporting Actor in a Drama Series, Stockard Channing for Outstanding Supporting Actress in a Drama Series, Oliver Platt for Outstanding Guest Actor in a Drama Series, Aaron Sorkin for Outstanding Writing for a Drama Series for "In the Shadow of Two Gunmen", and Laura Innes for Outstanding Directing for a Drama Series for "Shibboleth".

Thomas Del Ruth won an award from the American Society of Cinematographers for the episode "Noël".

References

General references

External links
 

 
2000 American television seasons
2001 American television seasons